
Year 255 (CCLV) was a common year starting on Monday (link will display the full calendar) of the Julian calendar. At the time, it was known as the Year of the Consulship of Valerianus and Gallienus (or, less frequently, year 1008 Ab urbe condita). The denomination 255 for this year has been used since the early medieval period, when the Anno Domini calendar era became the prevalent method in Europe for naming years.

Events 
 By place 

 China 
 Sima Shi quells Guanqiu Jian and Wen Qin's rebellion.
 March 23 – Sima Shi passes away.
 Sima Zhao, Sima Shi's younger brother, inherits his brother's authority.

 By topic 

 Science 
 Ma Jun, Chinese mechanical engineer from Cao Wei, invents the south-pointing chariot, a path-finding directional compass vehicle that uses a differential gear, not magnetics.

Births 
 January 6 – Marcellus I, bishop of Rome (d. 309)
 Dorotheus of Tyre, Syrian bishop and martyr (d. 362)
 Zhang Gui, Chinese governor of the Jin Dynasty (d. 314)
 Zuo Fen, Chinese poet of the Western Jin Dynasty (d. 300)

Deaths 
 February 23 – Guo Huai (or Boji), Chinese general
 March 16 – Guanqiu Jian, Chinese general and politician
 March 23 – Sima Shi, Chinese general and regent (b. 208)
 Fu Gu (or Lanshi), Chinese official and politician (b. 209)
 Liu Zan (or Zhengming), Chinese general (b. 183)
 Sun Luyu (or Xiaohu), Chinese princess

References